The 2012 Tallahassee Tennis Challenger was a professional tennis tournament played on hard courts. It was the 13th edition of the tournament which was part of the 2012 ATP Challenger Tour. It took place in Tallahassee, Florida, United States between 2 and 8 April 2012.

Singles main-draw entrants

Seeds

 1 Rankings are as of March 19, 2012.

Other entrants
The following players received wildcards into the singles main draw:
  Brian Baker
  Vahid Mirzadeh
  Tennys Sandgren
  Ryan Sweeting

The following players received entry as an alternate into the singles main draw:
  Frank Dancevic

The following players received entry from the qualifying draw:
  Martin Emmrich
  John Peers
  Artem Sitak
  Blake Strode

The following players received entry from the qualifying draw as a lucky loser:
  Cătălin Gârd
  Daniel Kosakowski

Champions

Singles

 Tim Smyczek def.  Frank Dancevic, 7–5, retired

Doubles

 Martin Emmrich /  Andreas Siljeström def.  Artem Sitak /  Blake Strode, 6–2, 7–6(7–4)

External links
Official Website
ITF Search
ATP official site

Tallahassee Tennis Challenger
Tallahassee Tennis Challenger